The 2018 Las Vegas Challenger was a professional tennis tournament played on hard courts. It was the fourth edition of the revamped tournament which was the part of the 2018 ATP Challenger Tour. It took place in Las Vegas, United States between 22 and 28 October 2018.

Singles main draw entrants

Seeds

 1 Rankings are as of October 15, 2018.

Other entrants
The following players received wildcards into the singles main draw:
  Alexander Cozbinov
  Evan Song
  Mikael Torpegaard
  J. J. Wolf

The following player received entry into the singles main draw as a special exempt:
  Borna Gojo

The following player received entry into the singles main draw as an alternate:
  Jan Choinski

The following players received entry from the qualifying draw:
  Mathias Bourgue
  Thai-Son Kwiatkowski
  Roberto Ortega Olmedo
  Tommy Paul

The following players received entry as lucky losers:
  Evan King
  Alexander Sarkissian
  Jelle Sels

Champions

Singles

  Thanasi Kokkinakis def.  Blaž Rola 6–4, 6–4.

Doubles

  Marcelo Arévalo /  Roberto Maytín def.  Robert Galloway /  Nathan Pasha 6–3, 6–3.

References

Las Vegas Challenger
Tennis in Las Vegas
Las Vegas Challenger
2018 in American tennis
2018 in sports in Nevada